Wicca is a nature-based religion.

Wicca(n) may also refer to:
Wicca (etymology)
Wicca (book series) or Sweep, a book series by Cate Tiernan
Wiccan (character), a Marvel comic book superhero

See also
Wiccia or Hwicce, an Anglo-Saxon tribe